Myrmeleon exitialis is a species of antlion in the family Myrmeleontidae. It is found in North America.

References

Further reading

 

Myrmeleontidae
Articles created by Qbugbot
Insects described in 1853